Shinagawa is a ward in Tokyo. Named after it are:
 Shinagawa Station
 Shinagawa Seaside Station

Family name 
 Shinagawa Masakazu
 Shinagawa Yajirō

Fictional characters:
 Daichi Shinagawa, the main character of Flunk Punk Rumble (Yankee-kun to Megane-chan)